Ekpo (Ghost) is a cultural society art form that originates from the Efik, Ibibio and Annang People in the Cross River/Akwa Ibom in Southern Nigeria. The practice was also adopted by neighboring regions, namely Arochukwu and Ohafia (Abia state) during the expansion of the Aro-Kingdom.

History 
The Ekpo same in meaning as Ekpe, Okpo-owo or Akpo-owo as pronounced by the Efik, Ibibio and Annang people simply describe it as a non-living human or a dead soul that comes to the land of the living.

In Akwa Ibom Ekpo Masquerades is practiced by almost all its towns especially during its Festivals at Ikot Ekpene, Etim Ekpo, Oruk Anam and Abak as well as the Eket and some other places in the Ibibio land.

In the 21st Century 

Due to advent of christianity and modern civilization, the Ekpo Masquerade is no longer regarded as dead souls that comes back to the land of the living, instead it is now known to be a costume worn by living humans and it is regarded as an integral part of the culture and heritage of the people.

See also 
Ekpo Nka-Owo

References 

Ekpo Akwa Ibom
Akwa Ibom State